Marc-Edmond Dominé (21 June 1848 – 28 June 1921) was a French Army officer who served in the Franco-Prussian War, the Sino-French War, and in the various territories of the French colonial empire.


Early life
Marc-Edmond Domine was admitted to the École spéciale militaire de Saint-Cyr in 1866.

Early Military Career
In October 1868, following his graduation from the École spéciale militaire de Saint-Cyr, Dominé selected the infantry as his preferred branch of the French Army. Dominé was deployed to Algeria where he was wounded in a skirmish; Dominé was appointed a Chevalier of the Legion of Honor for his conduct under fire. During the Franco-Prussian War, he was wounded a second time at the Battle of Beaune-la-Rolande.

References

1848 births
1921 deaths
People from Vitry-le-François
French Army officers
French military personnel of the Franco-Prussian War
Commandeurs of the Légion d'honneur
École Spéciale Militaire de Saint-Cyr alumni